Bridget Christine Flanery (born March 24, 1970 in Guthrie Center, Iowa) is an American actress.

Early life 
Bridget Christine Flanery was born on March 24 in Guthrie Center, Iowa. Flanery has an older sister, Jill, and three brothers, James, Bill and John. She studied Theatre and graduated from Drake University in 1992. After graduation, she relocated to Los Angeles to pursue a career in acting.

Career 
Flanery played Lila Fowler in the comedy-drama series Sweet Valley High from 1994 until 1996, when she was replaced by Shirlee Elliot. She was nominated for a Young Artist Award in 1997 for the Best Performance in a TV Comedy — Guest Starring Young Performer for the television show Pearl. Between 1996 and 1998, she portrayed Jill on sitcom Sabrina the Teenage Witch. She appeared in several guest starring television roles, including Love Boat: The Next Wave, Will & Grace, Desperate Housewives, Boy Meets World, Out of Practice, Without a Trace, Hart of Dixie and Two and a Half Men.

She has also appeared in theatre productions, including A Streetcar named Desire at the Yale Repertory Theatre, Loves and Hours at the Old Globe Theatre, and Spring Awakening at the Clemente Soto Velez Cultural Center. Flanery teaches acting at The Studio School in Los Angeles as of May 2019.

Personal life 
She has been married to Brandon Christy since August 8, 2009.

Filmography

References

External links

Living people
People from Guthrie Center, Iowa
Actresses from Iowa
Drake University alumni
Yale School of Drama alumni
American film actors
American television actresses
21st-century American actresses
Year of birth missing (living people)